Dr. Jaime Aristotle Alip''' (born April 22, 1957) is a Filipino social entrepreneur, and the Founder and Chairman Emeritus of the CARD Mutually Reinforcing Institutions, a group of companies composed of a microfinance NGO, banks, a development institute, microinsurance companies, IT companies, a publishing company, a tour operator, a pharmacy, and a laboratory. The companies were established to empower poor women on the countryside, to help eradicate poverty in the Philippines. CARD is the largest microfinance institute in the Philippines. Dr. Alip has won several awards for his work, such as the prestigious Ramon Magsaysay award in 2008 for public service. Dr, Alip was appointed as presidential adviser for Economic Empowerment of the Rural Poor in March 2011. He is also the recipient of the 2019 Ramon V. del Rosario Award for Nation Building.

References

1957 births
Living people
Harvard Business School alumni
21st-century Filipino businesspeople
Advisers to the President of the Philippines
People from San Pablo, Laguna
Filipino expatriates in the United States
Benigno Aquino III administration personnel
University of the Philippines alumni